Vikas Gupta may refer to:
Vikas Gupta (born 1988), Indian television producer, creative director and host known for participating in Bigg Boss 11
Vikas Gupta (politician), Indian politician from Fatehpur, Uttar Pradesh, affiliated with Bhartiya Janata Party
Vikas Gupta (businessman), Indian American internet entrepreneur